Turksib is a 1929 Soviet documentary film directed by Viktor Alexandrovitsh Turin documenting the building of the Turkestan–Siberia Railway. The rail line stretched northeast from Tashkent to Almaty and on to Novosibirsk. The film contrasts the open desert and sand, with the order of rails and movement of machines. The Turkic people ride horses and camels and rear sheep. This drama is set against the dry steppe as it is converted into a cotton growing region.

"Turksib" was particularly appreciated by the classic British and Canadian documentary filmmaker John Grierson, who prepared the English version of the picture.

The film was released on DVD and Blu-ray by the British Film Institute in 2011 as part of The Soviet Influence: From Turksib to Night Mail, with a newly commissioned soundtrack by Guy Bartell of British group Bronnt Industries Kapital.

References

External links 

1929 films
Soviet silent feature films
Soviet documentary films
1929 documentary films
Black-and-white documentary films
Documentary films about rail transport
Soviet black-and-white films
1920s Russian-language films